Thiruppu Munai is a 1989 Tamil-language crime film directed by Kalaivanan Kannadasan. The film stars Karthik and Chithra. It was released on 3 November 1989.

Plot 
Sathyamoorthy, an honest politician, becomes the new Minister of Justice. Chakravarthy, a corrupted politician, who wants to be a minister feels ridiculous and tries to kill Sathyamoorthy but Chakravarthy fails each time.

Rajaram, a jobless graduate, comes to the city to find a job. He has a mother in his village and he has a lot of debts. There, he becomes friend with Pichandi, who is also a jobless graduate, and Chidambaram, a disabled family man. Sangeetha, Chakravarthy's niece, interviews Rajaram for a job and he passes it well. Rajaram is hired by Chakravarthy but Chakravarthy asks him to first charm Chitra, Sathyamoorthy's daughter. Rajaram tries to charm her and Chitra falls in love with him. Sathyamoorthy wants to see, his daughter's lover, Rajaram, so Chakravarthy gives him a flower bouquet with a bomb inside. Sathyamoorthy appreciates Rajaram and he gives the flower bouquet to Sathyamoorthy. Sathyamoorthy dies in the bomb blast. Rajaram is sentenced to life imprisonment and Pichandi to five years in prison.

Chakravarthy has succeeded to the minister post and he decides to kill the witnesses. Anand, the jailer, because of his corrupted services, becomes the sub-jailer. Vanchinathan, who looks exactly like Rajaram, is the new jailer. Manimudi, Chakravarthy's henchman, kills Pichandi under the command of Chakravarthy and Vanchinathan is sentenced to life imprisonment. Vanchinathan then escapes from the jail and with Chitra, they try to flee the innocent Rajaram. Later, Chidambaram and his wife are murdered by Chakravarthy's henchmen.

Finally, Rajaram and Vanchinathan kill Chakravarthy's henchmen. Chakravarthy is sentenced to life imprisonment, Rajaram and Chitra get married and Vanchinathan decides to bring up Chidambaram's son.

Cast 
Karthik as Rajaram / Vanchinathan
Chithra as Chitra
Janagaraj as Pichandi
Vagai Chandrasekhar as Chidambaram
Vinu Chakravarthy as Chakravarthy
J. V. Somayajulu as Sathyamoorthy
Silk Smitha as Sangeetha
Sabitha Anand as Chidambaram's wife
Thyagu as Anand
Ajay Rathnam as Manimudi
Jai Ganesh in a guest appearance

Soundtrack 
The film score and the soundtrack were composed by Ilaiyaraaja, with lyrics written by Pulamaipithan, Ilaiyaraaja, Gangai Amaran and Kalaivanan Kannadasan.

References

External links 
 

1980s Tamil-language films
1989 crime films
1989 films
Films scored by Ilaiyaraaja
Indian crime films
Twins in Indian films